Xenisthmus polyzonatus (bull's-eye wriggler or polyzonate wriggler) is a species of fish in the Xenisthmidae (wriggler) family, which is regarded as a synonymous with the Eleotridae... It is found in the Indo-Pacific, from the Red Sea to Samoa, north to the Ryukyu Islands.

It is golden-brown to orange-brown in colour with approximately 10-12 irregular pale-greyish bars along its flanks and a small black spot with pale edges, like a bullseye, on the base of the tail. The spots on the dorsal and caudal fins form irregular stripes.

References

polyzonatus
Fish described in 1871
Fish of the Pacific Ocean
Fish of the Red Sea